Rotunda da Boavista, officially known as the Praça de Mouzinho de Albuquerque, is a large roundabout in Porto, Portugal. It honours Joaquim Augusto Mouzinho de Albuquerque, a Portuguese soldier who fought in Africa during the 19th century.

History and symbolism

A  column in the middle of the rotunda (Monumento aos Heróis da Guerra Peninsular) commemorates the victory of the Portuguese and the British against the French troops that invaded Portugal during the Peninsular War (1807–1814). The column, slowly built between 1909 and 1951, is a project by the celebrated Porto architect José Marques da Silva and the sculptor Alves de Sousa. The column is topped by a lion, the symbol of the joint Portuguese and British victory, which is bringing down the French imperial eagle. Around the base are sculptures of soldiers and civilians, the latter representing the people of Porto caught up in disaster on 29 March 1809 when the bridge (the Ponte das Barcas, supported by twenty linked boats) they were crossing to flee from Napoleon's troops collapsed, and more than four thousand people drowned in the River Douro. 

Completion of the column was delayed by two World Wars, and the monument was finally unveiled in 1952, some years after the deaths of both the sculptor and the architect, thanks to the dedicated work of Marques da Silva's daughter and son-in-law, Maria José Marques da Silva and David Moreira da Silva, themselves also architects.

Location
The Casa da Música, Porto's modern music venue, is located in the Rotunda da Boavista.

The Rotunda da Boavista has 31416 m² of area and there are eight streets reaching this roundabout:

 Avenida da Boavista (twice)
 Rua de Caldas Xavier
 Rua da Meditação
 Rua de Júlio Dinis
 Rua de Nossa Senhora de Fátima
 Avenida de França
 Rua de Cinco de Outubro

References

External links
Rotunda da Boavista / Praça Mouzinho de Albuquerque

Squares in Porto